Sankarani is a rural commune in the Cercle of Yanfolila in the Sikasso Region of southern Mali. The commune covers an area of 229 square kilometers and includes 8 villages. In the 2009 census it had a population of 7,876. The village of Bambala, the administrative center (chef-lieu) of the commune, is 30 km northwest of Yanfolila on the western shore of Lake Sélingué.

References

External links
.

Communes of Sikasso Region